Salar Afrasiabi is an Iranian football midfielder who plays for Payam Toos Khorasan in the League 2 (Iran).

Club career
Afrasiabi started his career with Siah Jamegan from Division 2. He made his professional debut for Siah Jamegan on July 30, 2015 against Esteghlal as a starter.

Club career statistics

References

External links
 Salar Afrasiabi at IranLeague.ir

1991 births
Living people
Iranian footballers
Association football midfielders
Siah Jamegan players
People from Gorgan